Nitrous oxide, desflurane, and isoflurane are the most commonly used anesthetic gases. They may cause some complications due to their leakage and storage failure.

Types of hazards

Biological hazards

Chemical hazards

Physical hazards

Personal hazards

Symptoms

Dizziness
Nausea
Fatigue
Irritatibility and depression
Restlessness
Drowsiness

Causes

1.escape when filling refillable vaporizers,

2.Leaks in the high pressure system between the nitrous oxide (N2O) cylinder,

3.Can escape from around the patient's anesthesia mask,

4.Can escape from around the patient's endotracheal tube

5.Can in an anesthetic medical procedure.

Prevention

Proper ventilation
Using exhausting fans
Proper care

See also
 A.C.E. mixture - a mixture of ethanol, chloroform and diethyl ether
 Anaesthetic
 Concentration effect

References
 https://www.osha.gov/dts/osta/anestheticgases/
 https://www.osha.gov/SLTC/wasteanestheticgases/
 
 http://www.medscape.com/viewarticle/857776

General anesthetics
GABAA receptor positive allosteric modulators
NMDA receptor antagonists